Jashubhai Dhanabhai Barad (15 September 1955 – 25 January 2016) was an Indian politician. He was a member of the 14th Lok Sabha of India where he represented the Junagadh constituency of Gujarat. He was a former Cabinet Minister of water resources and irrigation of Gujarat state. He played a vital role in the development of Narmada and Ukai Dam Projects. He served his fourth term as member of legislative assembly representing Talala Gir Constituency of Gujarat until 2016.

Early life
He hailed from Yadav/Ahir community. His family was a native of Badalpara village near Veraval. Jashubhai was also known as lion of saurastra and lion of sorath(Sorath no savaj) રાજનીતિ માં આવ્યા બાદ પોતે તાલાલા તાલુકાનાં ઘુસીંયા ગામે તેમની સ્કૂલ આવેલી છે ત્યાં રહેવાનું વધારે પસંદ કરતા હતા.

Career 
He was elected to Lok Sabha in 2004 Indian general election and represented Junagadh.

He was twice elected to Gujarat legislative assembly in 1990 and 1995 from Somnath constituency and became Cabinet Minister for water resources and irrigation. He was also twice elected to Gujarat legislative assembly in 1998 and in 2012 from Talala Gir constituency.

He died on 25 January 2016 at Ahmedabad following brain tumour.
After his death, his brother Bhagvanjibhai Barad was elected with 31,000 margin against BJP candidate Govindbhai Parmar.

References

External links
 Official biographical sketch in Parliament of India website

1955 births
2016 deaths
People from Junagadh
India MPs 2004–2009
Lok Sabha members from Gujarat
Indian National Congress politicians from Gujarat